The Cervantes Theater is located in the city of Guanajuato. The building is of stone in the colonial style, designed by José Martínez Cossi and inaugurated in 1979. It is a venue of the Festival Internacional Cervantino, but also holds other events during the rest of the year.

Description 
The theater is a rectangular stone building in colonial style, and includes a large wooden double door on its facade.  In front of the building is the Plaza Allende, which contains statues of Don Quijote and Sancho Panza on horseback. Inside, it has a capacity of 430 and a statue of writer Miguel de Cervantes Saavedra.

History 
The theater was designed by architect José Martínez Cossio and inaugurated on September 1, 1979. The first event held at the venue was a concert by pianist Guadalupe Parrondo. Previously, it was the site of the movie theater Cine Colonial, and the land once belonged to a hacienda dedicated to the smelting of metals.

On the fortieth anniversary of the Festival Cervantino, a time capsule was interred at the base of the Quijote and Panza statues, which included a book documenting the first four decades of the event as well as photographs, letters and more.

Function 
The venue is primarily for the Festival Internacional Cervantino, with less-regular events during the rest of the year. These include the Festival de Titerías (puppets) and Andar de Paella, organized by the Universidad Santa Fe as part of a week-long city gastronomy festival. The theatre has hosted plays, operas, concerts, dances, shows for children, festivals, film events, and state and local political events.

References

Theatres in Mexico
Guanajuato City